Rudon Bastian (born 13 January 1987) is a retired Bahamian long jumper.

As a junior he finished eleventh at the 2006 World Junior Championships, won the silver medal at the 2006 Central American and Caribbean Junior Championships,  and finished ninth at the 2008 NACAC Under-23 Championships.

He won the bronze medal at the 2009 Central American and Caribbean Championships, finished fourth at the 2010 Central American and Caribbean Games, seventh at the 2011 Pan American Games and sixth at the 2013 Central American and Caribbean Championships.

His personal best jump is 8.12 metres, achieved in July 2016 in Jacksonville.

References

1987 births
Living people
Bahamian male long jumpers

Competitors at the 2010 Central American and Caribbean Games
Pan American Games competitors for the Bahamas
Competitors at the 2011 Pan American Games